Eresina crola is a butterfly in the family Lycaenidae. It is found in western Kenya and Uganda. Its habitat consists of dense, primary forests.

References

Butterflies described in 1935
Poritiinae